Swida is a genus of plant in family Cornaceae. It contains the following species, which are synonymously categorized under the genus Cornus (this list may be incomplete):
Swida alternifolia 
Swida amomum 
Swida controversa 
Swida darvasica 
Swida racemosa 
Swida rugosa 
Swida sanguinea 
Swida sericea

References 

Cornaceae
Taxonomy articles created by Polbot
Cornales genera